Australian white rabbit, Australian White rabbit, or Australian White Rabbit may refer to:

 Australian White rabbit, a breed of rabbit available in several countries but developed in Australia
 Any rabbits in Australia (an introduced pest animal there) which happen to be white
 White Rabbit Brewery, an Australian business in South Geelong, Victoria
 White Rabbit Gallery, an Australian business in Chippendale and Rosebery, New South Wales
 White Rabbit (song), an Australia-only rock music record issued by Jefferson Airplane

See also 
 Australian White (disambiguation)